Phryssonotus is a genus of bristle millipedes containing around nine extant species. Species are characterized by the possession of dark, rear-projecting scale-shaped bristles (trichomes) on the tergites; all other bristles are long and hairlike. Adults in this genus have 17 pairs of legs, except for the species Phryssonotus brevicapensis, in which they have only 15 pairs of legs.

Species
Phryssonotus brevicapensis
Phryssonotus burmiticus
Phryssonotus capensis
Phryssonotus chilensis
Phryssonotus cubanus
Phryssonotus hystrix
Phryssonotus novaehollandiae
Phryssonotus orientalis
Phryssonotus platycephalus
†Phryssonotus burmiticus Cockerell 1917 Burmese amber, Myanmar, Cenomanian
†Phryssonotus hystrix Menge 1854 Baltic amber, Eocene

References

Polyxenida
Myriapod genera
Taxa named by Samuel Hubbard Scudder